Kimberly Ann Moore (née Pace; born June 15, 1968) is an American lawyer and jurist serving as chief United States circuit judge of the United States Court of Appeals for the Federal Circuit.

Early life and education
Moore was born in Halethorpe, Maryland. Moore received a Bachelor of Science degree in electrical engineering in 1990 and a Master of Science in 1991, from the Massachusetts Institute of Technology. She received her Juris Doctor, cum laude, from the Georgetown University Law Center in 1994.

Career 
From 1988 to 1992, Moore was employed in electrical engineering with the Naval Surface Warfare Center. She worked in private practice as an associate with the law firm of Kirkland & Ellis in Los Angeles, California from 1994 to 1995, and then clerked for United States Circuit Judge Glenn L. Archer Jr. from 1995 to 1997.

Moore taught at the Chicago-Kent College of Law from 1997 to 1999 and at the University of Maryland Francis King Carey School of Law from 1999 to 2000. She subsequently taught at the George Mason University School of Law as an associate professor from 2000 to 2004 and professor of law from 2004 until her appointment. Prior to her appointment, Moore also served as a mediator for the Federal Circuit Appellate Mediation Pilot Program. She also served as a lecturer for the Barbri Patent Bar Review, a review program for the USPTO registration examination.

Federal judicial service 
Moore was nominated to the Federal Circuit by President George W. Bush on May 18, 2006, to fill a seat vacated by Judge Raymond C. Clevenger III, who assumed senior status. The United States Senate confirmed Moore's nomination on September 5, 2006, by a 92–0 vote on February 1, 2006. She received her commission on September 8, 2006.  On May 22, 2021, Moore became chief judge, succeeding Sharon Prost.

Publications 
Moore authored Patent Litigation and Strategy with Federal Circuit Chief Judge Paul Redmond Michel, Raphael V. Lupo (1st and 2nd editions), Professor Timothy R. Holbrook of Emory Law School (3d and 4th editions), and John Frank Murphy (4th ed.). She was also editor-in-chief of the Federal Circuit Bar Journal.

Personal life
Moore has four children with her husband, Matt, who is a partner at Latham & Watkins LLP. Moore is Catholic, and attends the same church as the late Justice Antonin Scalia did. She has chambers in the Howard T. Markey National Courts Building in Washington, D.C.

References

External links

1968 births
Living people
21st-century American judges
21st-century American women judges
American women lawyers
Georgetown University Law Center alumni
George Mason University School of Law faculty
Judges of the United States Court of Appeals for the Federal Circuit
People associated with Kirkland & Ellis
MIT School of Engineering alumni
United States court of appeals judges appointed by George W. Bush